The Leitrim Observer is the oldest newspaper in County Leitrim. It is a weekly newspaper published every Wednesday and once competed with another newspaper called the Leitrim Post which was forced to close in 2009 during the economic crash.

History
The Leitrim Observer was founded by the Mulvey family  in 1889 and was bought by Pat Dunne, for a rumoured sum of £150 some time before 1910. The Black and Tans made the paper their first stop when they came to Carrick-on-Shannon during the War of Independence and badly burned the premises, destroying a lot of the early files of the paper.

In those times, the local news pages were printed at the paper's works in Carrick-on-Shannon, while the "international" news pages were printed elsewhere, and the front page was devoted entirely to advertising. During Pat Dunne's internment in Ballykinlar, County Down, his sister Liza ran the paper for a time. At one point the paper was printed on a Thursday and it was only when the second world war started in 1939 that this had the effect of bringing the paper's publishing day back a day to a Wednesday, in order to meet the Dublin train which was reduced to running on a once weekly basis.

The paper was brought initially by canal to Carrick and about one and a half bales of the paper would be enough for that week's paper. Each paper was folded by hand and it was not until the early 1950s that the first folding machine was introduced. By the latter part of the 20th century, the paper moved from hot metal printing to the use of linotype machines. Another milestone in the history of the paper was the investment for the Observer of an electronic photo-engraving machine, only the second of its kind in Ireland, which cost £5,000.

Pat Dunne died in 1968 and his nephew, Greg took over the running of the company, re-organising the paper and spending £10,000 on a Reel Fed Flat Bed printing machine from London and a Duplex machine which enabled the paper to introduce "spot" colour occasionally. In later years, another Pat Dunne, son of Greg, took over as managing director of the paper.

In September 1998 Scottish Radio Holdings purchased the Leitrim Observer for £1 million. UK-based group Johnston Press later purchased the Leitrim Observer in June 2005. Since 2014, the paper has been owned by Iconic Newspapers, which acquired Johnston Press's titles in the Republic of Ireland in 2014.

Circulation
According to ABC, circulation declined to 6,273 for the period July 2012 to December 2012, this represented a fall of 9% on a year-on-year basis.

References

1889 establishments in Ireland
Carrick-on-Shannon
Newspapers published in the Republic of Ireland
Publications established in 1889
Weekly newspapers published in Ireland